James Edward Hubert Gascoyne-Cecil, 4th Marquess of Salisbury,  (23 October 1861 – 4 April 1947), known as Viscount Cranborne from 1868 to 1903, was a British statesman.

Background and education
Born in London, Salisbury was the eldest son of Robert Gascoyne-Cecil, 3rd Marquess of Salisbury,  who served as British Prime Minister, by his wife Georgina (née Alderson). The Right Reverend Lord William Cecil, Lord Cecil of Chelwood and Lord Quickswood were his younger brothers, and Prime Minister Arthur Balfour his first cousin. He was educated at Eton and University College, Oxford, graduating BA in 1885.

Political career
He started public life early, being of a very young age when he accompanied his father to the 1876–1877 Constantinople Conference and a year later to the Congress of Berlin.

Lord Cranborne sat as Conservative Member of Parliament for Darwen, then called North-East Lancashire, from 1885 to 1892. He lost his seat at the general election of the latter year. He was elected for Rochester at a by-election in 1893, continuing as MP there until 1903, when he succeeded his father and was elevated to the House of Lords.

On 29 October 1892 Lord Cranborne was appointed lieutenant-colonel of the 4th (Militia) Battalion, Bedfordshire Regiment, (formerly the Hertfordshire Militia) of which his father was Honorary Colonel. Cranborne was in command when the battalion saw active service in South Africa from March to November 1900, during the Second Boer War. The battalion, numbering 24 officers and 483 men, left Queenstown on 27 February in the transport Goorkha, with Lord Cranborne as the senior officer in command, arriving in Cape Town the following month. He received the Queen's South Africa Medal and was appointed a Companion of the Order of the Bath (CB) for his service during the war. In July 1902 he received the Honorary Freedom of the borough of Hertford in recognition of his service during the war. He was still in command of the battalion on the outbreak of World War I. He was also Colonel of the wartime Hertfordshire Volunteer Regiment and Hon Col of the 4th Battalion, Essex Regiment, of the Territorial Force. Lord Salisbury was ADC to Edward VII, and George V until 1929.

He served under his father and then his cousin Arthur Balfour as Parliamentary Under-Secretary of State for Foreign Affairs from 1900 to 1903, under Balfour as Lord Privy Seal from 1903 to 1905, and as Lord President of the Board of Trade in 1905. In 1903 he was sworn of the Privy Council. In December 1908, he was appointed a deputy lieutenant of Hertfordshire. From 1906, following his uncle, he served as Chairman of the Canterbury House of Laymen.

Salisbury played a leading role in opposing David Lloyd George's People's Budget and the Parliament Bill of 1911. In 1917 he was made a Knight of the Garter. He returned to the government in the 1920s and served under Bonar Law and Stanley Baldwin as Chancellor of the Duchy of Lancaster from 1922 to 1923, as Lord President of the Council from 1922 to 1924, as Lord Privy Seal from 1924 to 1929 and as Leader of the House of Lords from 1925 to 1929 in successive Conservative governments of Bonar Law and Baldwin. He resigned as leader of the Conservative peers in June 1931 and became one of the most prominent opponents of Indian Home Rule in the Lords, supporting the campaign waged in the House of Commons by Winston Churchill against the Home Rule legislation.

Lord Salisbury continued as a committed and eager member of the Territorial Army: he was Honorary Colonel of 86th (East Anglian) (Hertfordshire Yeomanry) Field Regiment, Royal Artillery, and of 48th (South Midland) Divisional Engineers.

Salisbury was part of two parliamentary deputations which called on the Prime Minister, Stanley Baldwin, and the Chancellor of the Exchequer, Neville Chamberlain, in the autumn of 1936 to remonstrate with them about the slow pace of British rearmament in the face of the growing threat from Nazi Germany. The delegation was led by Sir Austen Chamberlain, a former Foreign Secretary and its most prominent speakers included Winston Churchill, Leo Amery and Roger Keyes.  The Marquess of Salisbury was Lord High Steward at the coronation of King George VI and Queen Elizabeth in 1937.

Marriage and children
Lord Salisbury married Lady Cicely Alice Gore (born 15 July 1867, died 5 February 1955), second daughter of Arthur Gore, 5th Earl of Arran, on 17 May 1887 at St. Margaret's Church, Westminster. Between 1907 and 1910 she served as a Lady of the Bedchamber to Queen Alexandra; additionally she was appointed an Officer of the Order of St John of Jerusalem, and as a Justice of the Peace for Hertfordshire.

The couple had four children:

 Lady Beatrice Edith Mildred Gascoyne-Cecil (born 10 August 1891, died 1980), married William Ormsby-Gore, 4th Baron Harlech.
 Robert Arthur James Gascoyne-Cecil, 5th Marquess of Salisbury (born 27 August 1893, died 23 February 1972).
 Lady Mary Alice Gascoyne-Cecil (born 29 July 1895, died 24 December 1988), married Edward Cavendish, 10th Duke of Devonshire.
 Lord Edward Christian David Gascoyne-Cecil, CH (known as Lord David Cecil) (born 9 April 1902, died 1 January 1986).

Lord Salisbury died in April 1947, at 85, and was succeeded by his eldest son, Robert. The Marchioness of Salisbury died in February 1955.

He was the grandfather of actor Jonathan Cecil by his youngest son, David.

Ancestry

References

External links
 , leighrayment.com; accessed 3 April 2016.

 
 

1861 births
1947 deaths
James
James Gascoyne-Cecil, 4th Marquess of Salisbury
Alumni of University College, Oxford
Chancellors of the Duchy of Lancaster
Children of prime ministers of the United Kingdom
Companions of the Order of the Bath
Deputy Lieutenants of Hertfordshire
Salisbury4
English Anglicans
Knights Grand Cross of the Royal Victorian Order
Knights of the Garter
Members of the Privy Council of the United Kingdom
Lord High Stewards
Lord Presidents of the Council
Lords Privy Seal
People educated at Eton College
Cranborne, James Edward Hubert Gascoyne-Cecil, Viscount
Cranborne, James Edward Hubert Gascoyne-Cecil, Viscount
Cranborne, James Edward Hubert Gascoyne-Cecil, Viscount
Cranborne, James Edward Hubert Gascoyne-Cecil, Viscount
Cranborne, James Edward Hubert Gascoyne-Cecil, Viscount
Cranborne, James Edward Hubert Gascoyne-Cecil, Viscount
Salisbury, M4
Leaders of the House of Lords
Conservative Party (UK) MPs for English constituencies
Presidents of the Board of Trade